Kalungu is a town in the Central Region of Uganda. It is the chief municipal, administrative, and commercial center in Kalungu District.

Location
The coordinates of the town are 00 10 05S, 31 45 36E (Latitude:-0.1680; Longitude:31.7600).

Landmarks
The landmarks within the town limits or close to the edges of town include:

 offices of Kalungu Town Council
 headquarters of Kalungu District Administration
 Kalungu central market

External links
 Kalungu District Information Portal

See also
Lake Victoria
Katonga River
Hospitals in Uganda

References

Kalungu District
Populated places in Central Region, Uganda
Lake Victoria